Harry Frederick Gerard Hadden-Paton (born 10 April 1981) is a British actor. He is perhaps best known for his television roles as Herbert Pelham, 7th Marquess of Hexham, in the television series Downton Abbey and Martin Charteris in The Crown.

Hadden-Paton played the lead role of Henry Higgins in the Lincoln Center Theater revival of My Fair Lady on Broadway, a performance for which he was nominated for the 2018 Tony Award for Best Actor in a Musical.

Life

Family
Hadden-Paton was born at Westminster Hospital in London, the son of former cavalry officer Nigel Hadden-Paton, head of a landed gentry family of Rossway, near Berkhamsted, Hertfordshire, and Sarah ('Bumble'), daughter of Brigadier Frederick Mellor, of The Cottage, Chiddingfold, Surrey. He has three sisters: Polly, Clementine, and Alice. He is the godson of Sarah, Duchess of York.

He is married to fellow actor Rebecca Night, whom he met while performing in The Importance of Being Earnest. They have been married since 2010 and have two daughters, Martha and Audrey. Hadden-Paton and Night co-starred in the autumn of 2019 in The King's Speech at the Chicago Shakespeare Theater.

Education
Hadden-Paton was educated at Eton College and Durham University. He trained at the London Academy of Music and Dramatic Art (LAMDA).

Stage
Since leaving LAMDA in 2006, Hadden-Paton has established himself as a leading stage actor. He was commended in the 2007 Ian Charleson Awards for his appearances in Romeo and Juliet at the Battersea Arts Centre and as John Worthing in The Importance of Being Earnest, directed by Peter Gill. His stand-out performances continued with Captain Jack Absolute in The Rivals at the Southwark Playhouse, as Hohenzollern in The Prince of Homburg at the Donmar Warehouse, and as Harry Villiers in the 2010 première of Posh at the Royal Court.

In 2011, he appeared as Teddy Graham in the Olivier Award-winning revival Flare Path at the Theatre Royal Haymarket, and as Jackie Jackson in a film adaptation of The Deep Blue Sea, both marking the centenary of their author, the English playwright Terence Rattigan.

Following the success of Flare Path he has appeared as Michael Palin in the premiere of Steve Thompson's No Naughty Bits at the Hampstead Theatre, as Marlow in Jamie Lloyd's production of She Stoops to Conquer at the National Theatre, as Alsamero in the Young Vic's production of The Changeling, and as Phillip in the hit revival of Alexi Kaye Campbell's The Pride at the Trafalgar Studios. Hadden-Paton made his Broadway debut playing Henry Higgins in a revival of My Fair Lady, for which he received Tony and Grammy Award nominations.

In 2021, Hadden-Paton originated a leading role in the new musical Flying Over Sunset, directed by James Lapine, at the Vivian Beaumont Theater, Lincoln Center, New York.  Having been postponed by the COVID-19 pandemic, the musical premiered on Broadway at the Vivian Beaumont Theater on November 11, 2021 in previews with the official opening scheduled for December 13, 2021. He resumes the role of Higgins at the London Coliseum in May 2022.

Film and TV
On television, he is best known for playing Bertie Pelham, the Marquess of Hexham, suitor of Lady Edith Crawley on Downton Abbey; their characters were married in the 2015 Christmas special that concluded the series. He has also starred in Midsomer Murders, The Amazing Mrs. Pritchard, Hotel Babylon, Silk, Waking the Dead, Drifters, Walter, Wallander, and Grantchester.

He is also notable for appearances in the Oscar-winning La Vie en Rose (2007), The Deep Blue Sea (2011), The Hollow Crown (2012), and About Time (2013).

From 2016 to 2017, he played the role of Martin Charteris in the first two seasons of the Netflix series The Crown.

Filmography

Film

Television

Video games

Theatre

Awards and nominations

References

External links

Living people
People educated at Eton College
1981 births
British male stage actors
British male film actors
Alumni of Grey College, Durham
Male actors from London
People from Westminster
Theatre World Award winners